These are all the Czech rail border crossings as of 2007. Crossings in italics are abandoned. The year of opening is in brackets.

Czech Republic – Austria 

Note that all of these railway lines were built in Austria-Hungary and became border crossings after the creation of Czechoslovakia in 1918.
Břeclav - Bernhardsthal (1839), see North railway
Novosedly - Laa an der Thaya (1872-1930)  
Hevlín - Laa an der Thaya (1870-1945)  
Znojmo - Retz (1871)
Slavonice - Fratres (1903-1945) 
České Velenice - Breitensee (1900-1950), narrow gauge 
České Velenice - Gmünd (1869), see Franz Josef Railway
České Velenice - Gmünd (1902-1950), narrow gauge Waldviertelbahn to Groß Gerungs, remaining bridge across Lužnice leads to a border crossing for pedestrians 
Horní Dvořiště - Summerau (1871)

Czech Republic – Germany 

Stožec - Haidmühle (1910-1945), currently 105 m long heritage railway only
Železná Ruda - Bayerisch Eisenstein (1877-1953, 1992), passenger transport only 
Česká Kubice - Furth im Wald (1861) 
Cheb - Waldsassen (1865-1945), currently a biking trail
Cheb - Schirnding (1883)
Aš - Selb - Plößberg (1865), reopened for passenger transport in December 2015
Hranice v Čechách - Adorf (1906-1945) 
Vojtanov - Bad Brambach (1856)
Kraslice - Klingenthal (1886-1952, 2000), passenger transport only
Potůčky - Johanngeorgenstadt (1889-1945, 2003)
Vejprty - Bärenstein (1872-1945, 1993)
Křimov - Reitzenhain (1875-1947) 
Moldava v Krušných Horách - Holzhau (1884-1945)
Děčín - Bad Schandau (1851)
Dolní Poustevna - Sebnitz (1905-1945), reopened in 2014
Rumburk - Ebersbach (1873)
Varnsdorf - Seifhennersdorf (1871), passenger transport only 
Varnsdorf - Großschönau (1871), passenger transport only 
Hrádek nad Nisou - Zittau (1859-1945, 1951), currently through Polish territory

Czech Republic – Poland 

Note that all these railway lines were built before the re-creation of Poland, so that some of them originally went to Germany, while others were entirely within the Austro-Hungarian empire.
Heřmanice - Bogatynia (Reichenau) (1900-1945), narrow gauge, see Frýdlant-Heřmanice Railway
Frýdlant v Čechách - Zawidów (Seidenberg) (1875), transport of goods only
Jindřichovice pod Smrkem - Mirsk (Friedeberg) (1902-1945) 
Harrachov - Jakuszyce (1902-1945, 2010–present), see Cog railway Tanvald-Harrachov and Izera railway
Královec - Lubawka (1869), regular traffic
Meziměstí - Mieroszów (1877)
Otovice - Tłumaczów (Tuntschendorf) (1889-1945) 
Náchod-Běloves - Kudowa Zdrój (1945)
Lichkov - Międzylesie (1875)
Bernartice - Dziewiętlice (-1945)
Vidnava - Kałków (1911-1945)
Mikulovice - Głuchołazy (1888)
Jindřichov ve Slezsku - Głuchołazy (1875)
Krnov - Głubczyce (1873-1945) 
Opava - Pilszcz (1909-1945) 
Chuchelná - Krzanowice (1895-1945)
Bohumín - Chałupki (1848)
Petrovice u Karviné - Zebrzydowice (1855)
Albrechtice - Marklowice (1914-1931), abolished after enactment of border with Poland, only base of bridge across Olza remained
Český Těšín - Cieszyn (1888)

Czech Republic – Slovakia 
Note that all of these railway lines were built before the dissolution of Czechoslovakia in 1993 and became border crossings in that year.
Mosty u Jablunkova - Čadca (1871)  
Horní Lideč - Lúky pod Makytou (1937) 
Vlárský průsmyk - Horné Srnie (1888)  
Velká nad Veličkou - Vrbovce (1929) 
Sudoměřice - Skalica (1893), no regular traffic
Hodonín - Holíč (1891), currently no regular traffic, used for diversions in case of temporary closures on Lanžhot - Kúty line
Lanžhot - Kúty (1900)

Unrealised projects 
Nová Bystřice - Litschau (gauge 760 mm) 
Moldava - Hermsdorf-Rehefeld, narrow gauge Pöbel Railway to Schmiedeberg on Weisseritz Railway
Dolní Světlá - Jonsdorf, extension of narrow gauge Zittau-Jonsdorf line
Hlučín - Chałupki (Annaberg)

See also 
Freedom Train (Czechoslovakia)
Polish rail border crossings
Slovak rail border crossings

References 
 Detailed article about abandoned border crossings

Rail transport in the Czech Republic
Rail